Shaman King is an anime series based on the manga of the same name written by Hiroyuki Takei. The series is directed by Seiji Mizushima and co-produced by TV Tokyo, NAS, and Xebec. At an early stage of anime production, Takei himself helped the anime's staff. However, he soon left the staff due to his time limitations as he was working on the manga. In September 2020, Mizushima commented that the original anime material presented in the latter half of the show was not something he did on his own accord, and it was requested from Shaman King'''s original publisher Shueisha. The 64 episodes were aired between July 4, 2001 and September 25, 2002 on TV Tokyo in Japan. While originally faithful to the manga, eventually the anime deviated from the original storyline as the manga was still being serialized at the time. As a result, the later half of episodes are completely unrelated to the manga, with a separate definite conclusion created for the 2001 series. 4Kids Entertainment obtained the rights to broadcast the Shaman King'' anime in the United States, where it premiered on FoxBox on September 6, 2003.

The episodes were collected into 16 DVD compilations by King Records in Japan and released between October 30, 2001, and January 22, 2003. The DVDs were later collected and released in three box sets between August 27, 2008, and December 25, 2008. Two DVD compilations of the English adaptation have been released by Funimation between October 19, 2004, and March 29, 2005, in an uncut form. In June 2020, it was announced that the series would be streamed on Full Anime TV and Bonbon TV services in Japan.

From episodes 1–34, the opening theme is "Over Soul" by Megumi Hayashibara while the ending theme is "Trust You" by Hayashibara. Several CDs that contain the theme music and other tracks have been released by King records.


Episode list

References

Shaman King (2001)
Episodes